Jamie Stauffer born  in Kurri Kurri, New South Wales, Australia is a professional motorcycle racer who competes in the Australian Superbike Championship aboard a Honda CBR1000RR.

Jamie started riding at the age of 4 and competed in the junior division of the dirt track series from 1991 to 1995 winning 17 State and 9 National titles.  From 1995 to 1999, he moved up to the senior dirt track division and won an additional 32 State and 7 National titles.

In 2000, he made the move to road racing and was the 1st privateer in the Australian Supersport Championship.  He also was the overall winner of the Aprilia Challenge Series and took the win at Daytona International Speedway in the Formula USA Aprilia Challenge.

He continued road racing the next few years for Yamaha and Kawasaki in Australia with one season (2003) in the AMA Championship in the  U.S.  In 2006, he won the Australian Superbike and Supersport Championships for Yamaha Australia.  In 2007, he wrapped up a second Australian Superbike title with one round remaining. Yamaha Japan paired Jamie with Norick Abe to compete in the prestigious Suzuka 8 Hours race in late July in Japan.

He is married to Emma and has three children. His brother-in-law, Adam Shields, raced Speedway bikes in the UKuntil 2013.  Jamie also shares his love of speedway, often racing speedway bikes for fun at the family track in Mulbring, Australia.

1979 births
Living people
People from New South Wales
Australian motorcycle racers
AMA Superbike Championship riders
Superbike World Championship riders